The 1976–77 Iowa State Cyclones men's basketball team represented Iowa State University during the 1976–77 NCAA Division I men's basketball season. The Cyclones were coached by Lynn Nance, who was in his first season with the Cyclones. They played their home games at Hilton Coliseum in Ames, Iowa.

They finished the season 8–19, 3–11 in Big Eight play to finish in last place. The Cyclones lost in the first round of the Big Eight tournament to first seeded Kansas State, falling 97-62.

Roster

Schedule and results 

|-
!colspan=6 style=""|Regular Season

|-
!colspan=6 style=""|Big Eight tournament

|-

References 

Iowa State Cyclones men's basketball seasons
Iowa State
Iowa State Cyc
Iowa State Cyc